The Renewed Presbyterian Church in Brazil is Presbyterian Pentecostal denomination in Brazil.

History
In 1968 a group from the PCB formed the Christian Presbyterian Church. The Independent Presbyterian Church had a Pentecostal segment too and they created the Renewed Independent Presbyterian Church. The Christian Presbyterian Church was founded and concentrated in Central Brazil, the leader of this group was Pastor Jonathan dos Santos Ferreira. The Renewed Independent Presbyterian church elected Rev. Palmiro Francisco de Andrade as President. These two streams united on January 8, 1975 in Maringa, PR and formed the current denominations. The new church progressed rapidly. The highest membership rate is in Paraná and São Paulo. The Renewed Presbyterian Church was born with more than 8,300 members and 84 parishes and 94 congregations, served by 59 pastors and 89 evangelists.

Its headquarters located in Arapongas, Paraná.

Statistics
According to the 2011 statistics the church has 132,000 members and 474 congregations and 50 presbyteries. In the end of 2012 the denomination had 139,009 members in 778 congregations and 694 preaching points and more than 803 pastors. The number of presbyteries are 53. It has Presbyterian church government with elders and deacons forms the session, the presbyteries and the highest governing body the General assembly.

Doctrine
The church professes credobaptism and don't adheres to the Westminster Confession of Faith. The denomination has a confession of faith of its own, which states:
1) the existence of free will;
2) saving faith as a human work, potentially produced by God;
3) that the Lord's Supper is only a memorial of Christ's death;
4) Baptism with the Holy Spirit is a second blessing, after conversion, which enables believers to fulfill the mission of the Church, according to the Pentecostal position.

Theological training
The denomination operates two seminaries: the Renewed Presbyterian Seminary in Anápolis, Goiás and Renewed Presbyterian Seminary in Cianorte, Paraná.

References

External links 
 Official website

Pentecostal Presbyterian Denominations in Brazil
Protestant denominations
Christian organizations established in 1975
Presbyterianism in Brazil